Air Test and Evaluation Squadron 31 (VX-31 or AIRTEVRON THREE ONE, commonly referred to by its nickname, "The Dust Devils" ) is a United States Navy air test and evaluation squadron based at Naval Air Weapons Station China Lake, California. Using the tail code DD, they fly numerous United States Navy and United States Marine Corps fixed-wing aircraft and helicopters.

The unit patch is seen in Top Gun: Maverick

External links
VX-31 Dust Devils official homepage

Test squadrons of the United States Navy
Military units and formations in California